Jackets Green is an Irish ballad by Michael Scanlan concerning an Irish woman and her beloved, Donal, an Irish soldier fighting in the Jacobite army of Patrick Sarsfield in the Williamite War.

Background
The French and Irish troops fighting for James II of England and VII of Scotland (known as Séamas a' Caca, or James the Shit, in Irish after he fled the Battle of the Boyne, abandoning his supporters) had fought their way back to Limerick. Here, the French leader Lauzun declined to defend the city against the pursuing Williamites, saying it could be taken "with rotten apples". He led his troops to Galway and returned to France with all his men and cannons, leaving the Irish in the lurch. 

Sarsfield, a clever military planner, said the city could be defended. When a Williamite deserter gave the information that King William and his officers had ridden forward ahead of their ammunition train and were waiting for it, Sarsfield led a raiding party with their horses' hooves muffled, led by the rapparee Galloping Hogan, through the Silvermine Mountains. One of Sarsfield's men fell behind when his horse lost a shoe, and got chatting to a woman also walking; she was the wife of a Williamite soldier on the way to meet her man, and told him that the Williamites' password was "Sarsfield". The Jacobites used the password to get into the camp - Sarsfield himself shouting "Sarsfield's the word, and Sarsfield's the man!" and they captured the 500 horses, ready saddled with pistols in saddle holstered, 150 wagons of ammunition and some 30 cannons and mortars, plus 12 wagons of provisions, all of which they blew up.

The result of Sarsfield's ride was that William of Orange's siege of Limerick failed after a fortnight, and the king sailed back to England. However, for the hero of the song, Donal, a soldier in Sarsfield's Jacobite army, is killed at Garryowen, an area within Limerick's walls, during that siege, defending his country; the song calls on all Irish women to love only those who "wear the jackets green" - a telling description, as the United Irishmen of the following century would wear green, and the Yeomen who suppressed that Rising summarily executed men and women found wearing green.

Sarsfield and his defence of Limerick are a touchstone of Irish national feeling, and the song by a Castlemahon poet who emigrated to Chicago and founded a successful candy business, there becoming a member of the secret Irish Republican Brotherhood which funded Ireland's struggle for independence, was popular in Ireland during that struggle. 

"Jackets green" is a joking statement by Irish people for any disaster, as is "down the glen", meaning lost and hopeless. Sarsfield himself, one of those thousands of Irish aristocrats and others who took service in the armies of Europe, died fighting for James II/VII's patron Louis XIV of France at the Battle of Landen in Flanders, exactly three years later, on 19 August 1693; as his life's blood flowed away he was heard to cry "Would that this blood were shed for Ireland".

Lyrics
When I was a maiden fair and young, 
On the pleasant banks of Lee, 
No bird that in the greenwood sung, 
Was half so blithe and free.
My heart ne'er beat with flying feet, 
No love sang me his queen, 
Till down the glen rode Sarsfield's men, 
And they wore the jackets green.

Young Donal sat on his gallant grey
Like a king on a royal seat,
And my heart leaped out on his regal way
To worship at his feet.
O Love, had you come in those colours dressed,
And wooed with a soldier's mein
I'd have laid my head on your throbbing breast
For the sake of your jacket green. 

No hoarded wealth did my love own,
Save the good sword that he bore;
But I loved him for himself alone
And the colour bright he wore.
For had he come in England's red
To make me England's queen,
I'd rove the high green hills instead
For the sake of the Irish green. 

When William stormed with shot and shell
At the walls of Garryowen,
In the breach of death my Donal fell,
And he sleeps near the Treaty Stone.
That breach the foeman never crossed
While he swung his broadsword keen;
But I do not weep my darling lost,
For he fell in his jacket green. 

When Sarsfield sailed away I wept
As I heard the wild ochone.
I felt, then dead as the men who slept 
'Neath the fields of Garryowen.
White Ireland held my Donal blessed, 
No wild sea rolled between, 
Till I would fold him to my breast 
All robed in his Irish green.

My soul has sobbed like waves of woe, 
That sad o'er tombstones break, 
For I buried my heart in his grave below, 
For his and for Ireland's sake.
And I cry. "Make way for the soldier's bride 
In your halls of death, sad queen 
For I long to rest by my true love's side 
And wrapped in the folds of green."

I saw the Shannon's purple tide 
Roll by the Irish town, 
As I stood in the breach by Donal's side 
When England's flag went down.
And now it lowers when I seek the skies, 
Like a blood red curse between.
I weep, but 'tis not women's sighs 
Will raise our Irish green.

Oh, Ireland, sad is thy lonely soul, 
And loud beats the winter sea, 
But sadder and higher the wild waves roll 
O'er the hearts that break for thee.
Yet grief shall come to our heartless foes, 
And their thrones in the dust be seen, 
So, Irish Maids, love none but those 
Who wear the jackets green.

See also
 Irish Brigade (France)

Notes

Irish songs
Jacobite songs